The Nimpkish River is a river in northern Vancouver Island in British Columbia, Canada.  It is the longest river on the Island, rising on the west slope of Mount Alston, flowing northwest into Nimpkish Lake and then north into the Broughton Strait at a point 8 km east of Port McNeill, just southwest of the town of Alert Bay on Cormorant Island.

Name origin
"Nimpkish" is an anglicization of the Kwak'wala name for the people of this area, the 'Namgis.

References

Rivers of Vancouver Island
Northern Vancouver Island
Rupert Land District